Walter Orel May was an American football guard who played one season for the Decatur Staleys in the American Professional Football Association (APFA). He attended and played football at Taylorville High School.

He and his brother Orel "Red" May played for the Taylorville Independents before joining the Staleys' works team in 1919.

References

External links
Red May Bio (Staley Museum)

1898 births
1972 deaths
American football guards
Decatur Staleys players
People from Taylorville, Illinois
Players of American football from Illinois